Xi Columbae is a binary star system in the southern constellation of Columba. With an apparent visual magnitude of 4.97, it is faintly visible to the naked eye. The system is a member of the HR 1614 supergroup, and is drifting further away with a radial velocity of +59.5 km/s,

This is an astrometric binary with an orbital period of 1,420.6 days and an eccentricity of 0.39. The star has expanded to 16 times the radius of the Sun and is radiating 120 times the Sun's luminosity from its swollen photosphere at an effective temperature of 4,743 K. The companion has a mass of at least 59% that of the Sun.

References

K-type giants
Astrometric binaries

Columba (constellation)
Columbae, Xi
Durchmusterung objects
040176
028010
02087